This is a list of characters from the Australian drama series McLeod's Daughters.

Main characters

Recurring cast

Engagements and marriages 

 Claire McLeod and Peter Johnson were engaged, but Claire ended the relationship when she found out Peter was already married and had children.
 After being best mates for about 15 years (and shortly after the birth of Charlotte McLeod) Claire McLeod and Alex Ryan were in a relationship. Claire died the day Alex intended to propose to her, after a previous failed attempt (the ring was lost during Alex's move to Drover's Run).
 Alex Ryan was going to propose to Claire McLeod the day that Claire had died in the crash; Claire was buried with the engagement ring that Alex had bought her.
 Jodi Fountain and Alberto Borelli had a wedding ceremony, but Jodi called off the marriage before the final paperwork was signed.
 Tess McLeod and Dave Brewer were engaged, but broke up when they realized that Dave was still grieving for his late wife.
 Harry Ryan and Sandra Kinsella were married after Harry divorced his first wife Liz.
 Nick Ryan and Tess McLeod married after several years of an on-off relationship. They remained married through the end of the series.
 Meg Fountain and Terry Dodge were married and set off for a trip around Australia.
 Alex Ryan and Fiona Webb married and quickly divorced.
 Jodi Fountain McLeod-Bosnich and Meg Fountain-Dodge return to Drover's Run in the final episode with news that Matt and Jodi are married and expecting a baby.
 Stevie Hall and Alex Ryan were married for a short time before Alex's death.
 Grace McLeod and Heath Barrett were engaged, but Grace called it off when she found out Heath was having an affair.

Births and pregnancies 

 Claire gives birth to a girl named Charlotte Prudence McLeod, nicknamed 'BOM' (= Baby of McLeod). Peter Johnson is the father, but initially it is claimed that Alex is the father. Later Peter learns the truth through a letter of Claire, as she wants Charlotte to know her real father (and Peter's name on the birth certificate). Alex and Tess are Charlotte's godparents. Charlotte is named after Tess, whose 2nd name is Charlotte, and Claire's mother Prudence.
 Sandra Kinsella-Ryan returns from her honeymoon and announces that she's pregnant, but miscarries soon after.
Nick's ex-girlfriend Sally returns unexpectedly to Drover's, eight months pregnant with his child. She soon gives birth to a son named Harrison Nicholas Ryan Clements.
 Tess gives birth in Argentina to a daughter named Claire Ruth McLeod Ryan.
 Stevie gives birth to a son named Alexander 'Xander' Hall Ryan soon after Alex dies. A short time before deciding on the name(s), Xander is called 'wombat'.
 Moira finds out she's pregnant with Phil Rakich's son in 2008, but miscarries early into the pregnancy.
 Jodi returns to Drover's Run in the series finale with news that she's pregnant.

Deaths

Actual Deaths
Brett 'Brick' Buchanon died after falling off a bridge. He had been missing for some time and was eventually found by Becky.
Claire McLeod died in a car accident when her ute went over a cliff. Tess and Charlotte were also in the accident, but managed to escape the vehicle before it crashed.
Harry Ryan died from a heart attack. It was later revealed that Sandra had tampered with his heart medication.
Riley Ward was involved in a car accident with Grace, Tayler, and Patrick. Their car was submerged in a river and Riley was presumed dead, though his body was never found.
 Alex Ryan died after a tree branch fell on him.

Throughout the series several main, recurring, or guest characters have lost their spouse: Beth Martin (Carmel Johnson), Alex Ryan, Dave Brewer, Jasmine McLeod (Anna Torv), Matt Bosnich/Rob Shelton, Stevie Hall-Ryan, Greg Hope (Matt Passmore), Daniel Lewis (Sandy Winton).

Fake Deaths

 Nick Ryan was thought to have died in a plane crash, but was later discovered alive in Argentina. He had been mugged and severely beaten, and had been unconscious in an Argentine hospital for several weeks.
 Matt Bosnich and Jodi Fountain were thought to have died in a car explosion. The next episode revealed that the car had blown up without them in it, but they were allowing people to think they were dead in order to evade the hitmen after them.
 Karl Weatherdon faked his death to resolutely leave his turbulent past behind, and become Harry J. Ryan. This was only discovered by Alex with help from Fiona, after Harry's real death.

References

McLeod's Daughters
McLeod's Daughters
McLeod's Daughters